Daphnella atractoides is a species of sea snail, a marine gastropod mollusk in the family Raphitomidae.

Description
The length of the shell varies between 5.5 mm and 10 mm.

Distribution
This marine species occurs off Taiwan, New Caledonia and the Fiji Islands.

References

 Hervier, J., 1898 Description d'espèces nouvelles de mollusques, provenant de l'archipel de la Nouvelle-Calédonie (suite) Journal de Conchyliologie, 45"1897" 165-192
 Fischer-Piette, E., 1950. Liste des types décrits dans le Journal de Conchyliologie et conservés dans la collection de ce journal (avec planches)(suite). Journal de Conchyliologie 90: 149-180
 Severns, M. (2011). Shells of the Hawaiian Islands - The Sea Shells. Conchbooks, Hackenheim. 564 pp

External links
 Hervier R.P. (1897), Descriptions d'espèces nouvelles provenant de l'Archipel de la Nouvelle Calédonie (suite); Journal de conchyliologie t.45 s.3 (1897)
 MNHN, Paris: specimen
 Gastropods.com: Daphnella (Daphnella) atractoides
 

atractoides
Gastropods described in 1897